Alexander Holtzoff (November 7, 1886 – September 6, 1969) was a United States district judge of the United States District Court for the District of Columbia.

Education and career

Born in New York City, Holtzoff received an Artium Baccalaureus degree from Columbia University in 1908, a Master of Arts degree from the same institution in 1909, and a Bachelor of Laws from Columbia Law School in 1911. He was in private practice in New York City from 1911 to 1924, excepting his service as a private in the United States Army in 1918. He was a special assistant to the Office of the Attorney General of the United States of the United States Department of Justice in Washington, D.C., from 1924 to 1945, and was an executive assistant in that office in 1945.

Federal judicial service

Holtzoff was nominated by President Harry S. Truman on September 12, 1945, to an Associate Justice seat on the District Court of the United States for the District of Columbia (Judge of the United States District Court for the District of Columbia from June 25, 1948) vacated by Judge Bolitha James Laws. He was confirmed by the United States Senate on September 24, 1945, and received his commission on September 28, 1945. He assumed senior status on December 31, 1967. His service terminated on September 6, 1969, due to his death.

See also
 List of Jewish American jurists

References

Sources
 

1886 births
1969 deaths
Lawyers from New York City
Military personnel from New York City
Columbia Law School alumni
Judges of the United States District Court for the District of Columbia
United States district court judges appointed by Harry S. Truman
20th-century American judges
United States Army soldiers
Columbia College (New York) alumni